Cimberis pilosa is a species of pine flower snout beetle in the family Nemonychidae. It is found in North America.

References

Further reading

 
 

Polyphaga
Articles created by Qbugbot
Beetles described in 1876